Duke of Masovia was a title borne by the sons and descendants of the Polish Duke Bolesław III Wrymouth. In accordance with the last will and testament of Bolesław, upon his death his lands were divided into four to five hereditary provinces distributed among his sons, and a royal province of Kraków reserved for the eldest, who was to be High Duke of all Poland. This was known as the fragmentation of Poland. Subsequent developments lead to further splintering of the duchies.

The following is a list of all rulers of the Duchy of Masovia and its parts. Although not all incumbents listed here had titular rights to the title of Duke of Masovia, they are all listed as such for simplicity's sake.

Also take note that some of the dates are merely approximate and the ownership of certain lands might be disputed. Finally, this table does not include lands ruled by dukes of other parts of partitioned Poland or Wenceslaus II and Wenceslaus III.

Duchy of Masovia

Partitions of Masovia

The Duchy went through various border changes in the coming years, sometimes losing and sometimes gaining territory.

Dukes of Masovia

Piast Dynasty

See also

 Piast dynasty
 List of Polish monarchs
 Duchy of Masovia

 
Dukes of Poland
History of Masovia